Augusta Blad (10 January 1871 in Copenhagen – 9 November 1953 in Frederiksberg) was a Danish actress.

She was educated at the Royal Theatre's student school (admitted to 1889) and debuted at the Royal Danish Theatre in 1892 as Sophie in Adam Oehlenschläger's piece Erik and Abel of 1820. She played with many of the greatest names of the time and was especially known for being an excellent performer of Oehlenschläger's work.

She made her film debut in 1911 at Nordisk Film in the successful film . After that, she was one of Nordisk Film's most prominent actresses and appeared in over 30 silent films. In 1917 she joined Valdemar Psilander's new film company, which was taken over by Olaf Fønss after his death in the same year. In this company, she starred in four silent films, including  Towards the Light in 1929. She also starred in a single sound film:  from 1940, which was also her last film.

She was the daughter of director Siegfred Blad (1835–1902) and Louise Dorothea Blad (née Rasmussen) (1837–1917). In December 1899 she married actor . The marriage was dissolved in 1904. Augusta Blad died on 9 November 1953, and is buried at Mariebjerg Cemetery in Gentofte.

She received the Danish royal Ingenio et arti award in 1934.

References

External links 

 Augusta Blad in the Dansk Biografisk Leksikon

Danish silent film actresses
Danish film actresses
Danish stage actresses
Recipients of Ingenio et Arti
People from Copenhagen
19th-century Danish people
20th-century Danish people
Burials at Mariebjerg Cemetery